The 2019–20 Sam Houston State Bearkats men's basketball team represented Sam Houston State University in the 2019–20 NCAA Division I men's basketball season. The Bearkats, led by tenth-year head coach Jason Hooten, played their home games at the Bernard Johnson Coliseum in Huntsville, Texas as members of the Southland Conference. They finished the season 18–13, 11–9 in Southland play to finish in a tie for fourth place. They were set to on Northwestern State in the second round of the Southland tournament until the tournament was cancelled amid the COVID-19 pandemic.

Previous season
The Bearkats finished the 2018–19 season 21–12 overall, 16–2 in Southland play, to finish as Southland Conference regular season champions. In the Southland tournament, they were upset by New Orleans in the semifinals. As a regular season league champion who failed to win their league tournament, they received an automatic bid to the NIT, where they lost to TCU in the first round.

Roster

Schedule and results

|-
!colspan=12 style=| Regular season

|-
!colspan=12 style=| Southland tournament
|- style="background:#bbbbbb"
| style="text-align:center"|March 12, 20205:00 pm, ESPN+
| style="text-align:center"| (4)
| vs. (5) Northwestern StateSecond round
| colspan=2 rowspan=1 style="text-align:center"|Cancelled due to the COVID-19 pandemic
| style="text-align:center"|Merrell CenterKaty, TX
|-

Source

See also 
 2019–20 Sam Houston State Bearkats women's basketball team

References

Sam Houston Bearkats men's basketball seasons
Sam Houston State Bearkats
Sam Houston State Bearkats men's basketball
Sam Houston State Bearkats men's basketball